José Millán-Astray y Terreros (July 5, 1879 – January 1, 1954) was a Spanish soldier, the founder and first commander of the Spanish Legion, and a major early figure of Francoist Dictatorship.

Astray was notable for his disfigured body: during his time in the army, he lost both his left arm and right eye and was shot several times in the chest and legs.

Early life 
Born in A Coruña, Galicia, his father was José Millán Astray, a lawyer, poet, librettist of the Zarzuela genre, and chief jailer of Madrid. His mother was Pilar Terreros Segade, an illustrator and comedic author and his sister, Pilar Millán Astray was to be a noted writer. Though pressed to study law, Millán-Astray aspired to a military career.

On August 30, 1894, he entered the Academia de Infantería de Toledo ("Infantry Academy of Toledo"). He graduated as a second lieutenant at the age of sixteen, and later served in the army in Madrid. On September 1, 1896, he enrolled in the Escuela Superior de Guerra ("Superior Military School").

On March 2, 1906, he married Elvira Gutiérrez de la Torre, daughter of General Gutiérrez Cámara. Only after the wedding did she reveal her intention to remain chaste. From this point on, the couple would maintain (in Millán-Astray's own words) a "fraternal relationship".

Career 
Upon graduation, he joined the General staff of the Spanish Army. Soon after, the Philippine Revolution broke out, and he left his position to serve there as a volunteer second lieutenant. He would earn numerous decorations for his valor (Cruz de María Cristina, Cruz Roja al Mérito Militar, and Cruz Primera Clase al Mérito Militar) and became something of a war hero for his defence at the age of 18 of the city of San Rafael, in which he fought off a rebel force of two thousand with only thirty men. He subsequently served in the Rif War.

On October 26, 1924, while stationed in Spanish Morocco, he was wounded in the left arm during an ambush resulting in it needing to be amputated. 

He continued leading his men and a month later, he lost his right eye when it was hit by a bullet. 

This earned him the sobriquet Glorioso mutilado ("Glorious amputee"). He habitually wore an eyepatch and a white glove on his right hand when appearing in public.

Interested in forming a corps of foreign volunteers after the fashion of the French Foreign Legion, he traveled to Algeria to study its workings. With the support of then Major Francisco Franco, he created the Spanish Legion, and, with the rank of lieutenant colonel, served as its first commander. He would popularize the mottos ¡Viva la Muerte! ("Long live death!") and ¡A mí la Legión! ("To me the legion!"). 

Millán-Astray gave the legion a powerful ideology intended to evoke Spain's Imperial and Christian traditions. For instance, the legion adopted a regimental unit called the tercio in memory of the famed Spanish infantry formations that had terrorized their opponents on the battlefields of Europe in the 16th and 17th centuries. Millán-Astray also revived the Spaniard's ancient feud with the Moors and portrayed his men first as crusaders on an extended Reconquista against the Islamic civilization; and later as the saviours of Spain warding off the twin evils of Communism and democratic liberalism.  Favored by King Alfonso XIII and rewarded for his heroic leadership of the Legion in the aftermath of the Spanish military defeat at Annual, in 1924, he was promoted to full colonel. In 1927, he was promoted to brigadier general.  In 1932, the Republican government of Azaña placed him on the retirement list along with other generals regarded as hostile to the Republic. 

During the Spanish Civil War he sided with the Nationalists. He served as director of the Office of Radio, Press, and Propaganda (1936-1937) on the Nationalist side and later (1937) was named head of the Corps of Wounded Veterans. It is said that he administered the press office like a military barracks, forcing journalists to fall in line in response to his whistle, and subjecting them to the same brutal harangues he had given as commander of the Legion.

Confrontation with Unamuno 

Millán-Astray is perhaps best remembered for a heated response to Miguel de Unamuno, the writer and philosopher, on October 12, 1936. The celebration of the 12th of October had brought together a politically diverse crowd at the University of Salamanca, including Enrique Pla y Deniel, the Archbishop of Salamanca, and Carmen Polo Martínez-Valdés, the wife of Franco, and Millán-Astray himself. According to the British historian Hugh Thomas in his magnum opus The Spanish Civil War (1961), the affair began with an impassioned speech by the Falangist writer José María Pemán. After this, Professor Francisco Maldonado decried Catalonia and the Basque Country as "cancers on the body of the nation," adding that "Fascism, the healer of Spain, will know how to exterminate them, cutting into the live flesh, like a determined surgeon free from false sentimentalism." 

From somewhere in the auditorium, someone cried out the motto "¡Viva la Muerte!". As was his habit, Millán-Astray responded with "¡España!"; the crowd replied with "¡Una!". He repeated "¡España!"; the crowd then replied "¡Grande!". A third time, Millán-Astray shouted "¡España!"; the crowd responded "¡Libre!". This was a common Falangist cheer. Later, a group of uniformed Falangists entered, saluting the portrait of Franco that hung on the wall. 

Unamuno, who was presiding over the meeting, rose up slowly and addressed the crowd: "You are waiting for my words. You know me well, and know I cannot remain silent for long. Sometimes, to remain silent is to lie, since silence can be interpreted as assent. I want to comment on the so-called speech of Professor Maldonado, who is with us here. I will ignore the personal offence to the Basques and Catalans. I myself, as you know, was born in Bilbao. The Bishop," Unamuno gestured to the Archbishop of Salamanca, "Whether you like it or not, is Catalan, born in Barcelona. But now I have heard this insensible and necrophilous oath, "¡Viva la Muerte!", and I, having spent my life writing paradoxes that have provoked the ire of those who do not understand what I have written, and being an expert in this matter, find this ridiculous paradox repellent. General Millán-Astray is an invalid. There is no need for us to say this with whispered tones. He is an invalid of war. So was Cervantes. But unfortunately, Spain today has too many invalids. And, if God does not help us, soon it will have very many more. It torments me to think that General Millán-Astray might dictate the norms of the psychology of the masses. It should be expected from a mutilated who lacks the spiritual greatness of Cervantes to find horrible solace in seeing how the number of mutilated ones multiplies around him." Unamuno went on to praise the executed Filipino dissident Jose Rizal, infuriating Millan-Astray who had actually fought against the rebels in the Spanish-ruled Philippines.

Millán-Astray reportedly responded: "¡Muera la inteligencia! ¡Viva la Muerte!" ("Death to intelligence! Long live death!"), provoking applause from the Falangists (although some versions suggest he actually said: "Death to traitor intellectuality" but in the commotion in the auditorium this was not perceived). Pemán, in an effort to calm the crowd, exclaimed: "¡No! ¡Viva la inteligencia! ¡Mueran los malos intelectuales!" ("No! Long live intelligence! Death to the bad intellectuals!").

Unamuno continued: "This is the temple of intelligence, and I am its high priest. You are profaning its sacred domain. You will win, because you have enough brute force. But you will not convince. In order to convince it is necessary to persuade, and to persuade you will need something that you lack: reason and right in the struggle. I see it is useless to ask you to think of Spain. I have spoken." Millán-Astray, controlling himself, shouted "Take the lady's arm!" Unamuno took Carmen Polo by the arm and left in her protection.

Unamuno's quote "Venceréis, pero no convenceréis" ("You will win, but you will not convince") was, paradoxically, the slogan of the Salamanca municipality protesting the devolution from the General Archive of the Spanish Civil War to the Catalan Government of Catalan documentation seized during the war by the nationalist forces. Unamuno's heirs publicly decried this use. Unamuno left the hall escorting the wife of Franco, Carmen Polo de Franco, who had been present.

In 2018, the details of Unamuno's speech were disputed by the historian Severiano Delgado, who suggested that the account in a 1941 article by Luis Gabriel Portillo (who was not present at Salamanca) in the British magazine Horizon may not have been an accurate representation of events.

Later life 
 
In 1941, during a game of bridge, he fell in love with Rita Gasset, daughter of former public works minister Rafael Gasset, and cousin of philosopher José Ortega y Gasset. As a result, Millán-Astray separated from his wife Elvira. Franco, seeking to avoid a scandal, relocated Millán-Astray to Lisbon. Here, Rita gave birth to Millán-Astray's only child, a daughter named Peregrina, on January 23, 1942.

After the affair, Millán-Astray was largely forgotten by the Spanish public. He eventually returned to Madrid, where he died of heart failure on January 1, 1954.

Reputation 
Millán-Astray was by all accounts prone to actions and general demeanor frequently described as impulsive and ruthless, even by the standards of most Africanist officials. There is no conclusive evidence concerning the causes of these actions, which could be prompted by environmental conditioning, his alleged drug use, or undiagnosed medical conditions.

Legacy
For over 50 years a street in Madrid was named in his honour. In 2018, as part of a wider removal of street names linked to Francoism, it was renamed Justa Freire in memory of a jailed opponent of Francoism. In August 2021, a Madrid court ruled that the previous name was not incompatible with the Historical Memory Law as it commemorated his military achievements which predated Francoism and the street was restored to its former name of General Millán Astray on 24 August 2021. Six days later, the street name was vandalised.

References

External links 
 Biographical profile from the Friends of the Spanish Legion
 Article discussing the parallels between José Millán Astray and Miguel de Unamumo
 Biographical article from Spartacus Educational
 Detailed Spanish biography from the 

1879 births
1954 deaths
People from A Coruña
Spanish generals
People of the Rif War
Spanish military personnel of the Spanish Civil War (National faction)
Spanish Roman Catholics
Francoist Spain
Spanish amputees
Spanish anti-communists